Ali Buba Lamido is an Anglican archbishop in Nigeria.

Lamido is Bishop of Wusasa, Archbishop of Kaduna and Dean of the Church of Nigeria.

Notes

Living people
Anglican bishops of Wusasa
Anglican archbishops of Kaduna
21st-century Anglican archbishops
21st-century Anglican bishops in Nigeria
Nigerian Anglicans
Year of birth missing (living people)
Deans of the Church of Nigeria